A list of notable French philosophers:

 
Philosophers
French